The Portia Club is a women's club based in Payette, Idaho. Its clubhouse building, at 225 N. 9th St. in Payette, was built in 1927 and was listed on the National Register of Historic Places in 2010.

The club was formed in 1895.  It was named for Portia, the beautiful and intelligent protagonist of Shakespeare's Merchant of Venice.

"They may have started their club over a small tea party in 1895, but during the next twenty years they started the Payette City Library, funded Children's Free Health Clinics, organized the Payette Apple Blossom Festival, sponsored lectures on laws that affected women and children, held debates on women's issues and spread the virtues of art and literature throughout the city of Payette, Idaho."

It joined the Idaho Federation of Women's Clubs in 1904 and later the General Federation of Women's Clubs.

Fundraising for a building started in 1919. Eventually more than $4000 was accumulated, and Fruitland, Idaho architect I.C. Whitley was hired to design it. He designed it in Spanish Colonial Revival style, which the architect had learned about in trip to southern California.

In 2005, the historic building was acquired by a 501c3 nonprofit, The Friends of the Portia Club, Inc., formed to restore and preserve it. It now serves as a community center and is available for rental.

References

External links
Portia Club, official website

Women's clubs in the United States
Women's club buildings
National Register of Historic Places in Payette County, Idaho
Spanish Colonial Revival architecture in the United States
Buildings and structures completed in 1927
Clubhouses on the National Register of Historic Places in Idaho
History of women in Idaho
Buildings and structures in Payette County, Idaho